Nyangatjatjara College is an independent Anangu  co-educational school located just outside Yulara, in the Northern Territory, Australia.

The College provides primary and secondary education for students in the region who speak Pitjantjatjara as their first language. The College has campuses in Docker River, Mutitjulu and Imanpa.

The College is a member of the Association of Independent Schools of the Northern Territory.

See also 

 List of schools in the Northern Territory

References

Notes

Citations

External links 
 Nyangatjatjara College home page
  Nyangatjatjara College webpage on the AISNT website
 College's iPad-based communications strategy

Private secondary schools in the Northern Territory
Educational institutions established in 1997
1997 establishments in Australia
Pitjantjatjara
Aboriginal schools in the Northern Territory